On 21 August 1986, a limnic eruption at Lake Nyos in northwestern Cameroon killed 1,746 people and 3,500 livestock.

The eruption triggered the sudden release of about 100,000–300,000 tons (1.6 million tons, according to some sources) of carbon dioxide (CO2).

Eruption and gas release
What triggered the catastrophic outgassing is not known. Most geologists suspect a landslide, but some believe that a small volcanic eruption may have occurred on the bed of the lake. A third possibility is that cool rainwater falling on one side of the lake triggered the overturn. Others still believe there was a small earthquake, but because witnesses did not report feeling any tremors on the morning of the disaster, this hypothesis is unlikely. The event resulted in the supersaturated deep water rapidly mixing with the upper layers of the lake, where the reduced pressure allowed the stored  to effervesce out of solution.

The normally blue waters of the lake turned a deep red after the outgassing, due to iron-rich water from the deep rising to the surface and being oxidised by the air. The level of the lake dropped by about a metre and trees near the lake were knocked down.

Scientists concluded from evidence that a  column of water and foam formed at the surface of the lake, spawning a wave of at least  that swept the shore on one side.

Since carbon dioxide is 1.5 times the density of air, the cloud hugged the ground and moved down the valleys, where there were various villages. About 4,000 inhabitants fled the area, and many of these developed respiratory problems, lesions, and paralysis as a result of the gas cloud.

However,  was the only gas detected in samples of lake water, suggesting that this was the predominant gas released and as such the main cause of the incident.

Effects on survivors 

Reporters in the area described the scene as "looking like the aftermath of a neutron bomb." One survivor, Joseph Nkwain from Subum, described himself when he awoke after the gases had struck:Following the eruption, many survivors were treated at the main hospital in Yaoundé, the country's capital. It was believed that many of the victims had been poisoned by sulphur-based gases. Poisoning by these gases would lead to burning pains in the eyes and nose, coughing and signs of asphyxiation similar to being strangled.

Interviews with survivors and pathologic studies indicated that victims rapidly lost consciousness and that death was caused by  asphyxiation. At nonlethal levels,  can produce sensory hallucinations, such that many people exposed to  report the odor of sulfuric compounds when none are present. Skin lesions found on survivors represent pressure sores, and in a few cases exposure to a heat source, but there is no evidence of chemical burns or of flash burns from exposure to hot gases.

De-gassing 
The scale of the disaster led to much study on how a recurrence could be prevented. Several researchers proposed the installation of degassing columns from rafts in the middle of the lake.

Starting from 1995, feasibility studies were successfully conducted, and the first permanent degassing tube was installed at Lake Nyos in 2001. Two additional pipes were installed in 2011.

Similar danger suspected at Lake Kivu 
Following the Lake Nyos disaster, scientists investigated other African lakes to see if a similar phenomenon could happen elsewhere. In 2005, Lake Kivu in the Democratic Republic of the Congo, 2,000 times larger than Lake Nyos, was also found to be supersaturated, and geologists found evidence that outgassing events around the lake happened about every thousand years.

However, a study undertaken in 2018 and released in 2020 found flaws in the 2005 study, including a possible bias in the conversion of concentrations to partial pressures, to an overestimation of concentrations, or to a problem of calibration of sensors at high pressure. The 2020 study found that when these errors were accounted for, the risk of a gas eruption at Lake Kivu did not seem to be increasing over time.

See also

 Lake Monoun
 List of natural disasters by death toll

References

External links 
 Google Earth view of the area around Lake Nyos

1986 natural disasters
1986 in Cameroon
Natural disasters in Cameroon
20th-century volcanic events
Gas explosions
August 1986 events in Africa
Volcanic tsunamis
1986 disasters in Africa